Vetispiradiene synthase (EC 4.2.3.21) is an enzyme from Egyptian henbane that catalyzes the following chemical reaction:

(2E,6E)-farnesyl diphosphate  vetispiradiene + diphosphate

This enzyme belongs to the family of lyases, specifically those carbon-oxygen lyases acting on phosphates.  The systematic name of this enzyme class is (2E,6E)-farnesyl-diphosphate diphosphate-lyase (cyclizing, vetispiradiene-forming). Other names in common use include vetispiradiene-forming farnesyl pyrophosphate cyclase, pemnaspirodiene synthase, HVS, and vetispiradiene cyclase.  This enzyme participates in terpenoid biosynthesis.

References

 
 
 
 
 

EC 4.2.3
Enzymes of unknown structure